Neil Joseph William Sandilands (born May 1, 1975) is a South African actor and filmmaker, known for roles in both film and television and for his versatility in filmmaking. In 2016, he had recurring roles on Sundance TV's Hap and Leonard as Paco and The CW's The 100 as Titus. In 2017, he joined the main cast of The CW series The Flash, playing Clifford DeVoe / The Thinker.

Career
Sandilands began his career in South Africa, his motherland, acting in a variety of projects, most notably in the television series 7de Laan as Bart Kruger beginning in 2000. He departed the show after seven years and moved to Los Angeles in 2007. In 2010, Sandilands was featured in an episode of the popular American drama series House, but soon returned to South Africa to star in a number of popular Afrikaans films, including the award-winning drama Die Ballade van Robbie de Wee. Sandilands also took up production work before returning to Hollywood in 2014. "I had to revert to other disciplines such as directing and post-production and sometimes built fences for my neighbours or some other unmentionable activities to simply keep the wolf at bay," Sandilands said of his journey back to the United States.

In 2015, Sandilands secured a guest stint on the hit FX series The Americans. The following year in 2016, he had recurring roles as Titus in The CW's The 100 and as Paco in the SundanceTV's Hap and Leonard. In 2017, Sandilands had a guest role in the long-running CBS series NCIS and joined the main cast of The CW superhero drama The Flash as Clifford DeVoe / The Thinker.

In August 2022, Sandilands was cast in a role in the film Kingdom of the Planet of the Apes, to be directed by Wes Ball for 20th Century Studios.

Personal life
Sandilands speaks both English and his native language, Afrikaans.

Filmography

Acting

Film

Television

Video games

Other work

References

External links
Neil Sandilands home page
Neil Sandilands at Discogs
Neil Sandilands at IMDb

1975 births
Living people
Afrikaner people
People from Randfontein
South African film directors
South African film producers
South African male film actors
South African male television actors